The 16th Lumières Awards ceremony, presented by the Académie des Lumières, was held on 14 January 2011. The ceremony was presided by François Berléand. Of Gods and Men won the award for Best Film.

Winners and nominees
Winners are listed first and highlighted in bold.

See also
 36th César Awards
 1st Magritte Awards

References

External links
 
 
 16th Lumières Awards at AlloCiné

Lumières Awards
Lumières
Lumières